Thomas Edward Magee (17 February 1929 – 22 March 2021) was an Australian rules footballer who played with Fitzroy and Melbourne in the Victorian Football League (VFL).

Notes

External links 

1929 births
2021 deaths
Australian rules footballers from Victoria (Australia)
Fitzroy Football Club players
Melbourne Football Club players